Pasek is a surname. Notable people with the surname include:

 Andrzej Pasek, Polish 52nd place in Mixed individual eventing, 2004 Summer Olympics
 Benj Pasek, half of the Pasek and Paul writing team, youngest winners of the Jonathan Larson Performing Arts Foundation award
 Bret Pasek, world's fastest fire eater. Broke Guinness World Records most fire torches extinguished in one minute with the mouth on Sept. 7, 2014 with 99 consumed.
 Dušan Pašek (ice hockey, born 1985) (1985-2021), Slovak ice hockey player
 Jan Chryzostom Pasek, szlachcic of Polish-Lithuanian Commonwealth in the 17th century
 Justine Pasek, Miss Panama, first runner-up in the 2002 Miss Universe competition